Glenn Hughes or Glen Hughes may refer to:
Glenn Hughes (musician), born 1951
Glenn Hughes (American singer) (1950–2001)
Glenn Hughes (cricketer), born 1959
Glen Hughes, Australian rugby league player, born 1973